Kuisebmond Stadium is an open-air stadium in Walvis Bay, Namibia. It is home to several teams in the Namibia Premier League, including the Eleven Arrows and Blue Waters football clubs. The stadium has capacity for 4,000 spectators.

Kuisebmond Stadium takes its name from the mouth of the Kuiseb River, located south of Walvis Bay. The stadium was renovated in 2009 at a cost of three million Namibian dollars.

On January 13, 2021, Robert Hamukonda, aged 34, hanged himself in the stadium following a domestic argument.

References

Football venues in Namibia
Buildings and structures in Walvis Bay